Christine Van Loo is an international speaker, elite champion athlete in acrobatic gymnastics and world-renowned aerialist. She has performed over 2,000 times, to a global audience in over 30 countries, inspiring millions of people around the world, everywhere from the Sydney Opera House to Madison Square Garden to the Kennedy Center. Live performances include a six-week tour with Paul McCartney during which time she opened solo before millions of people. Christine has also been featured on BBC's 100 Women, ESPN's World Class Women, NBC's The Today Show, Good Morning America, BET, in National Geographic World Magazine, in Time/Life Books, and on the cover of the International Gymnast Magazine.

Speaking & Coaching career 
As a high performance expert, Christine helps Fortune 500 CEOs, corporate leaders, employees and other clients achieve breakthrough results by transcending limiting beliefs that prevent them from reaching their peak potential. She shows you how to apply “unstoppable champion mindset” and “elite athletic habits” to your daily work life to rise above limiting beliefs, overcome adversity, improve concentration, narrow your focus, and boost maximum productivity in business and life.

Christine is an esteemed member of GPS, an elite group of speakers with members in 30 countries and 6 continents.

Athletic career 
Christine is a 7-time National Champion (Acrobatic Gymnastics - Mixed Pairs, 1983–89), She was named the 1988 Olympic Female Athlete of the Year for Sports Acrobatics and named the Athlete of the Decade for the 1980s by the U.S. Sports Acrobatics Federation. She was inducted into the USSA (acro-gymnastics) Hall of Fame and the World Acrobatics Society Gallery of Honor. She is considered a Legend in her sport.

Performance career 
Christine is a professional aerialist. She has toured with Paul McCartney's European tour, performed at  the American Music Awards, (with Aerosmith), in two Grammy Award ceremonies (with Ricky Martin and with No Doubt), She has shared the stage with other mega artists such as Sarah McLachlan, Josh Groban, Aaron Neville, REO Speed Wagon, Sugar Ray, Goo Goo Dolls, Tommy Lee and Earth, Wind and Fire. She performed at the 2002  Winter Olympics, and the Miss Universe pageant, as well as several feature films, television shows and music videos. She choreographed the aerials for Britney Spears' world tour and the Stars on Ice U.S. tour. She worked as a trainer on the television show Celebrity Circus.  She performed for Cirque du Soleil an aerial act 80 feet off a nine-story building from a hot air balloon. Since 2008, Van Loo has performed with Cirque de la Symphonie.

Personal life 
Christine has lived in four countries - the US, Mexico, Italy and Costa Rica. She speaks four languages.

Van Loo is co-founder of Airborne Arts Retreat Center in Costa Rica, founder and CEO of Van Loo Productions and of VisionAerialist, LLC.  She is the author of Falling to the Top and a contributor to the mega-bestseller Chicken Soup for the Soul series.

References

External links
 Personal site
 National Champions - Acrobatic Gymnastics

Year of birth missing (living people)
Living people
Acrobats
American circus performers
American acrobatic gymnasts
Female acrobatic gymnasts